Sukadiri is a district located in the Tangerang Regency of Banten in Java, Indonesia.

The subdistrict of Rawa Kidang in Sukadiri formed part of the particuliere landerij or private domain of Tan Eng Goan, 1st Majoor der Chinezen of Batavia.

References

Tangerang Regency
Districts of Banten
Populated places in Banten